is a Japanese musician, singer and songwriter. He originally became known on an international level for his work in the anime Macross 7 where he was the singing voice and guitar of the show's main character, Basara Nekki. Fukuyama is currently enjoying a successful career recording both solo and member of the anison band JAM Project.

Early years and personal life 

Yoshiki Fukuyama was born in Tokyo and raised in Kamakura. At age 5, he began taking piano lessons. He and his future bandmate, Toshiyuki Furuya, had the same piano teacher. In his early teen years, he discovered The Beatles, which led to his interest in playing guitar. In high school, Fukuyama was a member of a Queen tribute band called “他” (hoka), which means “other” in Japanese. The band was reportedly so named because they were frequently listed as “other” on concert billings.

Fukuyama currently lives in Kamakura along with his wife, a daughter, and a few pets. He and his wife, Kyoko Fukuyama, generally work as a songwriting team; he composes the music while she writes most of the lyrics for his songs. Fukuyama is an accomplished musician who plays several instruments. On his solo albums, he performs all of the instruments except drums (played by Shoichiro Aso) for most of the songs.

Career

Early Gigs: 1982 to 2000 and Macross 7 
In college, Yoshiki Fukuyama, Toshiyuki “Rocky” Furuya, and various friends formed the band Doolin Dalton (later changed to Dalton Kougyou), often performing songs by The Eagles and similar bands. Fukuyama played bass and shared the lead vocal position with Furuya. Fukuyama also played guitar and sang with the comedy rock band Kirenjaku. Although he occasionally sang lead with Kirenjaku, fellow band member Takeshi Yamaguchi performed most of the band's lead vocals. Kirenjaku recorded one four-song EP. Fukuyama and Furuya, along with several other friends formed the band Maps.

By 1988, Maps had evolved into the band Humming Bird for which Fukuyama is often remembered. Humming Bird played a blend of rock and folk with roots in the hard rock and roll of the 1960s to 1980s, such as Queen or The Beatles. Initially, Humming Bird had only two official members: Yoshiki Fukuyama on guitar and vocals and Toshiyuki Furuya on bass and vocals. The final band roster was set in 1992 with the official addition of Shoichiro Aso on drums. Humming Bird enjoyed moderate success, having released nine albums before disbanding in May 2000.

Yoshiki Fukuyama was the singing voice and guitarist for the main character Basara Nekki in the anime Macross 7. Fukuyama, Chie Kajiura, Tomo Sakurai, and various studio musicians recorded several albums of songs that were used in the show. Most of the time, the work was merely credited to Fire Bomber, although Fukuyama's name does appear in the songwriting credits of several songs. Also he and his band, Humming Bird, are both listed in the “Thank You” section of all the Fire Bomber album credits.

2000s to Present 
Fukuyama began his solo career after Humming Bird. Fukuyama teams up on occasion with Masato Ushijima to form the folk/rock duo Wild Vox. They are mostly a live band, but they did record one album, Yasei no Kaze, that was released in April 2002. In 2003, Yoshiki Fukuyama joined the anime music supergroup JAM Project. In 2006, Yoshiki Fukuyama released his smash hit single "Makka na Chikai" (真赤な誓い). The song peaked at #33 on the Oricon weekly chart and charted for 12 weeks. It is his best-selling solo single to date. In 2009, for the 15th anniversary of Macross 7, Fire Bomber released a studio album entitled Re.Fire. The album peaked at 16th on the Oricon 300 and stayed on that chart for a total of seven weeks. In early 2011, Fukuyama announced he was recording a new studio album, and released Synapse on April 6 of that year.

Following a Macross 25th anniversary concert, Fukuyama and actor Nobutoshi Kanna joined forces to perform a number of concerts together. Since the production of Macross 7, the two men had worked together portraying the character Basara Nekki. Kanna acted and Fukuyama sang and played guitar. They had considered the name Basaras for their duo, but decided instead on Fukujin, which was created by combining the first kanji of their respective surnames. From time to time, as their busy careers permit, they sing together onstage and create a series of internet radio broadcasts called Fukujin Tsuke. On November 23, 2008, Fukujin performed its first international concert in Taipei, Taiwan.

Discography

Humming Bird Studio Albums 

[1991.06.21] Humming Bird
[1993.04.21] Timeless
[1995.07] EGM Live 
[1995.12.21] Pick Up
[1996.03.06] 1.2.3
[1996.03.20] Shukufuku to Namida
[1997.05.21] A Piece of Cake
[1998.05.21] Shukufuku to Namida - CD re-release
[1998.05.21] Pick Up - CD re-release
[1998.07.21] Humming Bird - CD re-release
[1998.07.21] Timeless - CD re-release
[1999.03.03] Unsweet
[2000.05.24] Happy Birthday - Best and Live Anthology
.

Macross 7 Studio Albums 

[1995.06.07] Let's Fire!! 
[1995.10.21] Second Fire!! 
[1995.12.16] Karaoke Fire!! 
[1996.10.23] Acoustic Fire!! 
[1998.01.21] Dynamite Fire!! 
[1999.04.07] Ultra Fire!! 
[2005.05.21] Let's Fire!! - CD re-release
[2005.05.21] Second Fire!! - CD re-release
[2005.05.25] Fukuyama Fire ~A Tribute to Nekki Basara~
[2008.05.21] Karaoke Fire!! CD re-release
[2008.06.25] Acoustic Fire!! CD re-release
[2008.06.25] Ultra Fire!! CD re-release
[2008.06.26] Dynamite Fire!! - CD re-release

Original Studio Albums 

[2003.08.22] Sakebu Otoko no Shouzou
[2004.07.09] Jungle Lady
[2006.04.12] Allegory
[2007.08.22] Yellow House
[2008.07.29] REBIRTH DAY
[2011.03.30] SYNAPSE 
[2011.04.27] 20 FLIGHT ROCK ~YOSHIKI FUKUYAMA SELECTED WORKS~

Singles
[1991.05.21] Happy birthday (HummingBird)
[1992.02.21] Kanashimi wa doko kara (HummingBird)
[1993.09.21] Ima wa ikiru hito he (HummingBird)
[1994.11.02] Seventh Moon (Fire Bomber)
[1995.04.10] Heart and Soul (Fire Bomber)
[1997.04.23] Ride on the night (HummingBird)
[1997.10.22] Dream Jack (HummingBird)
[1997.12.17] Dynamite explosion (Fire Bomber)
[1998.11.21] Lookin' for the rainbow (HummingBird)
[1999.09.01] Get free (HummingBird)
[1999.10.21] Hikarinaki yoru wo yuke (HummingBird)
[2002.09.21] King Gainer over!
[2006.11.22] Makka na chikai!
[2008.05.28] Work Guy!!
[2010.05.27] Kemono ni nare!
[2014.05.21] Nue no Mori

External links 
 Yoshiki Fukuyama Official Website 
 JAM Project Official Site
 Fukujin Official Blog
 Rocky's World (The official Humming Bird Site)
 three nine entertainment
 Lantis
 Macross Official Home Page

Information Sources 
Biographical information in this article was translated from information on the following official sites:
 Rocky's World (The official Humming Bird Site)
 Yoshiki Fukuyama Official Website 
 Kirenjaku Official site

1963 births
Living people
Japanese male voice actors
Japanese rock guitarists
People from Kanagawa Prefecture
Musicians from Kanagawa Prefecture
Anime musicians
JAM Project members
20th-century Japanese guitarists
21st-century Japanese guitarists
20th-century Japanese male singers
20th-century Japanese singers
21st-century Japanese male singers
21st-century Japanese singers